Karkhaneh-ye Salar may refer to:
Karkhaneh Sefid Kan
Karkhaneh-ye Hakim